The Glitter and Doom Tour was a concert tour by American rock musician Tom Waits from June–August 2008.

Background
The tour was announced at a performance art press conference on May 5, 2008.

Tickets
Tickets for Waits' summer shows were limited to two per person but, in an effort to beat ticket touts, a valid I.D. (passport or driving license) matching the name on the ticket was required to gain entry. Any concert-goer who did not have a valid I.D. or was found to be in possession of a ticket that had been resold – electronic scanners were employed – was not allowed in and did not get a refund.

Band 
As of July 22 Tom Waits band consisted of the following:
 Vincent Henry – woodwinds
 Casey Waits – drums
 Omar Torrez – guitar/banjo
 Patrick Warren – keyboard
 Seth Ford-Young – bass
 Sullivan Waits – clarinet/conga

Tour dates

Notes 

2008 concert tours
Tom Waits concert tours